Alexander Philip Scrini (born 18 October 1976) is an English banker and former first-class cricketer.

Scrini was born at Sheffield in October 1976. He later studied at Hertford College at the University of Oxford. While studying at Oxford, he played first-class cricket for Oxford University, making his debut against Durham at Oxford in 1997. He played first-class cricket for Oxford until 1998, making twelve appearances. Playing as a wicket-keeper, he scored a total of 253 runs in this twelve matches, at an average of 21.08 and with a high score of 58 not out. Behind the stumps, he took 13 catches.

After graduating from Oxford, Scrini moved into the financial industry and is currently employed by Morgan Stanley.

References

External links

1976 births
Living people
People from Sheffield
Alumni of Hertford College, Oxford
English cricketers
Oxford University cricketers
English bankers
Morgan Stanley employees